Sherif Saleh (born 12 November 1954) is an Egyptian sports shooter. He competed at the 1984 Summer Olympics, the 1988 Summer Olympics and the 1992 Summer Olympics.

References

1954 births
Living people
Egyptian male sport shooters
Olympic shooters of Egypt
Shooters at the 1984 Summer Olympics
Shooters at the 1988 Summer Olympics
Shooters at the 1992 Summer Olympics
Place of birth missing (living people)